Runesoft GmbH, stylised as RuneSoft (founded as e.p.i.c. interactive entertainment gmbh), is a German publisher founded in 2000 that ports games to alternative platforms such as Linux, Mac OS X, AmigaOS, MorphOS, and magnussoft ZETA. Alongside their own published games, they also ported Software Tycoon and Knights and Merchants: The Shattered Kingdom for Linux Game Publishing.

Starting in 2012 the company started to offer some of their game catalogue on the Desura digital distribution service.

Published titles

Released 
 Simon the Sorcerer II: The Lion, the Wizard and the Wardrobe (2000) (Mac OS X and AmigaOS)
 Knights and Merchants: The Shattered Kingdom (2001) (Linux, Mac OS X and MorphOS)
 Earth 2140 (2001) (Linux, Mac OS X and AmigaOS)
 Birdie Shoot (2002) (Windows, Mac OS X, and MorphOS)
 The Feeble Files (2002) (Mac OS X and AmigaOS)
 Gorky 17 (2002) (Mac OS X)
 Robin Hood: The Legend of Sherwood (2002) (Linux, Mac OS X, MorphOS, and magnussoft ZETA)
 Blitzkrieg (2003) (Mac OS X)
 Chicago 1930 (2003) (Mac OS X)
 RHEM (2003) (Windows and Mac OS X)
 Alida (2004) (Mac OS X)
 Barkanoid 2 (2004) (Linux, Mac OS X, and MorphOS)
 Airline Tycoon Deluxe (2005) (Linux, Mac OS X, MorphOS, and magnussoft ZETA, iPhone, Raspberry Pi)
 Cold War (2005) (Mac OS X)
 RHEM 2: The Cave (2005) (Windows and Mac OS X)
 Ankh (2005) (Linux and Mac OS X)
 Ankh: Heart of Osiris (2006) (Linux and Mac OS X)
 Buku Sudoku (2006) (Mac OS X)
 Ankh: Battle of the Gods (2007) (Mac OS X)
 Jack Keane (2007) (Linux and Mac OS X)
 101 Puppy Pets (2007) (Mac OS X)
 Europa Universalis 3 (2007) (Mac OS X)
 Global Conflicts: Palestine (2007) (Mac OS X)
 Big Bang Board Games (2008) (Mac OS X)
 Dream Pinball 3D (2008) (Mac OS X)
 Global Conflicts: Latin America (2008) (Mac OS X)
 RHEM 3: The Secret Library (2008) (Windows and Mac OS X)
 Hearts of Iron III (2009) (Mac OS X)
 RHEM 4: The Golden Fragments (2010) (Windows and Mac OS X)
 Patrician IV (2010) (Mac OS X)
 Buku Kakuro (Mac OS X)
 Burning Monkey Mahjong (Mac OS X)
 Burning Monkey Solitaire (Windows and Mac OS X)
 Dr. Tool (R) Maths Trainer (Mac OS X)
 Dr. Tool (R): Eye Trainer (Mac OS X)
 Dr. Tool(R) Brain Jogging Vol. 2 (Mac OS X)
 Mahjongg Mac (Mac OS X)
 MangaJONGG (Mac OS X)
 Metris IV (Mac OS X)
 Murmeln and More (Mac OS X)
 Solitaire Mac (Mac OS X)
 The Legend of Egypt (Mac OS X)
 The Legend of Rome (Mac OS X)
 The Legend of the Tolteks (Mac OS X)
 Toysight (Mac OS X)
 Pet Doc (Mac OS X)
 Lemurs (Mac OS X)
 Northland (Linux and Mac OS X)
 Software Tycoon (AmigaOS and Linux)
 Strategy 6 (Mac OS X)
 The 8th Wonder of the World (Mac OS X)
 Winter Games (Mac OS X)
 Officers: World War II (Mac OS X)

See also 
 Linux Game Publishing

References

External links 
 RuneSoft - Official website
 www.epic-interactive.com Webpage before name change (archived, 2001)

German companies established in 2000
Video game companies established in 2000
Linux game porters
Video game companies of Germany
Video game development companies
Companies based in Baden-Württemberg
Tübingen